Phantom power is a method of sending DC electrical voltage through microphone cables.

Phantom power may also refer to:
Standby power, power consumed by any device while it is switched off.
Phantom Power (Rick Wakeman album), a 1990 album
Phantom Power (The Tragically Hip album), a 1998 album
Phantom Power (Super Furry Animals album), a 2003 album